Tetyana Holovchenko or Tetiana Holovchenko (born 13 February 1980, Okhtyrka) is a Ukrainian middle/long-distance runner who specializes in the 1500 and 3000 metres.

Achievements

Personal bests
800 metres - 2:00.81 min (2004)
1500 metres - 4:05.01 min (2006)
3000 metres - 8:50.67 min (2004)
5000 metres - 15:26.88 min (2007)

References

External links

1980 births
Living people
Ukrainian female middle-distance runners
Ukrainian female long-distance runners
Ukrainian female marathon runners
World Athletics Championships athletes for Ukraine
Universiade medalists in athletics (track and field)
European Cross Country Championships winners
Universiade silver medalists for Ukraine
Medalists at the 2005 Summer Universiade
Medalists at the 2007 Summer Universiade
20th-century Ukrainian women
21st-century Ukrainian women